Gréta Arn was the defending champion, but chose not to participate that year.

Maria Kirilenko won in the final 6–4, 6–2, against Iveta Benešová.

Seeds

Draw

Finals

Top half

Bottom half

External links
Draw and Qualifying Draw

Estoril Open
2008 Women's Singles
Estoril Open